Milenko Sebić (born 30 December 1984) is a Serbian sports shooter. He won a bronze medal in men's 50 metre rifle 3 positions at the 2020 Summer Olympics.

Sebić was part of the Serbian national team that won a gold medal in 50 metre rifle prone at the 2009 European Shooting Championships and a bronze medal in 50 metre rifle 3 positions event in 2007. He won a silver medal at the 2007 Summer Universiade in Bangkok in 50m rifle 3 positions event. He also competed in the men's 10 metre air rifle and men's 50 metre rifle 3 positions events at the 2016 Summer Olympics.

Personal life
In October 2014, Sebić married Russian sports shooter Alina Sebić (née Andreeva).

References

External links
 

1984 births
People from Trstenik, Serbia
Living people
Serbian male sport shooters
Olympic shooters of Serbia
Shooters at the 2016 Summer Olympics
European Games competitors for Serbia
European champions for Serbia
Universiade medalists in shooting
Shooters at the 2015 European Games
Shooters at the 2019 European Games
Shooters at the 2020 Summer Olympics
Universiade silver medalists for Serbia
Medalists at the 2007 Summer Universiade
Olympic bronze medalists for Serbia
Medalists at the 2020 Summer Olympics
Olympic medalists in shooting
21st-century Serbian people
Mediterranean Games gold medalists for Serbia
Competitors at the 2022 Mediterranean Games
Mediterranean Games medalists in shooting